Brahma Pala (reigned 990-1010) was the founder of the Pala Dynasty (990–1138) of the Kamarupa kingdom. He married Kula Devi, by whom he had a successor to his throne named Ratna Pala.

See also
 Kamarupa - Late to end period
 Pushyavarman
 Bhaskaravarman

References

Further reading
   
 
 
 
 
 
 
 
 
 
 
 

Pala dynasty (Kamarupa)
920 deaths
10th-century Indian monarchs